Joe Pingue is a Canadian actor and film maker.

Early life
Pingue was born and raised in St. Catharines, Ontario. He attended Ridley College for both elementary and high school, and studied theatre at York University.

Career

Giuseppe "Joe" Pingue is a Canadian character actor. He became known for playing supporting roles in many films such as Miss Sloane, American Whiskey Bar, Pompeii, Antiviral, The Boondock Saints, Repo Men, Blindness, The Book of Eli, Maps to the Stars and Dream House.

His television work includes appearances on Degrassi: The Next Generation, Orphan Black, Wild Card, 24 Hour Rental, Across the River to Motor City, The Expanse., Godless and the 2021 HBO mini-series Station Eleven. He also is the voice of Tamago on the animated series The Very Good Adventures Of Yam Roll In Happy Kingdom, the voice of Entree in the cartoon Spliced, Dan in Trucktown, Ming in Kody Kapow, and additional voices in Norman Picklestripes, and Agent Binky: Pets of the Universe.

Producing and writing
Pingue produced, wrote and appeared in the 2008 short film The Answer Key, which was nominated for a Genie Award.  He also directed, produced and wrote the short film Chili & Cheese: A Condimental Rift which won the top Prize at the Marin County Short Film Festival and had its television premiere on CBC.

Awards

References

External links

 Chili & Cheese: A Condimental Rift at National Screen Institute 

Living people
Canadian people of Italian descent
Canadian male film actors
Canadian male television actors
Canadian male voice actors
Male actors from Ontario
21st-century Canadian male actors 
Ridley College alumni
York University alumni
Year of birth missing (living people)